Halarachne is a genus of mites belonging to the family Halarachnidae.

Species:
Halarachne americana  (extinct)
Halarachne halichoeri 
Halarachne laysanae

References

Mesostigmata
Acari genera